The West Kelowna Warriors are a Junior "A" ice hockey team from West Kelowna, British Columbia, Canada.  They are a part of the British Columbia Hockey League (BCHL) and play in the Interior Conference.

The West Kelowna Warriors are a relocated franchise, moving to West Kelowna in 2006 from Langley, British Columbia.

History

Langley Thunder/Hornets
Langley was originally granted a British Columbia Junior Hockey League (BCJHL) franchise in 1973 called the Langley Lords. The team played as the Lords through the 1975–76 season. In those three years they had very decent regular seasons, making it to the playoffs each year, including a loss in the league finals in their first season. In 1976 the Lords changed their name to the Langley Thunder. Their regular season performance diminished each year and they missed the playoffs for the first time in the franchise's history in the 1978–79 season. Shortly after the completion of the 1978–79 season, the franchise ceased operations. An unrelated BCJHL franchise, the Chilliwack Colts, relocated to become the Langley Eagles from 1981–82 through the 1986–87 seasons, before moving back to Chilliwack, British Columbia.

 In 1990, the BCJHL was renamed the BCHL, and in 1994 Langley returned to the BCHL with a new franchise, adopting the name Thunder from the defunct franchise of the 1970s. The new franchise competed as the Thunder for five seasons, reaching the BCHL championship finals in 1996, which they lost to the eventual Junior A national Royal Bank Cup champion Vernon Vipers, 4–1.

The Thunder changed their name to the Langley Hornets before the start of the 1998–99 season. Playing in Langley from 1998 through the 2005–06 season, the Hornets were led by several coaches. Coach Rick Lanz was notable for taking the last place 2001–02 team and guiding them to a fourth-place finish in the 2002–03 season, though the team would be eliminated in the first round of the BCHL playoffs. Lanz was not re-signed for the next season and the team returned to last place in the BCHL.

Westside/West Kelowna Warriors

Before the start of the 2006–07 season the franchise moved from Langley to the unincorporated area on the "westside" of Kelowna, British Columbia, and renamed themselves the Westside Warriors. The Westside Warriors found immediate success, reaching the BCHL playoffs in the 2006–07 season, followed in 2007–08 with a third place BCHL finish in the regular season and making it to the BCHL semi-finals in the playoffs.

In late 2007, the unincorporated area the Westside Warriors called home became the incorporated Westside District Municipality, and in 2008 changed its name to West Kelowna.  The franchise kept the place name Westside, rather than West Kelowna, through the 2011–12 season. In the summer of 2012, the Westside Warriors announced they would be changing their name to the West Kelowna Warriors, recognizing the proper name of the municipality where they play.

In 2018, the Warriors were purchased by Kim Dobranski and KD Sports Ltd. from Mark Cheyne and the Vision Sports Group LLP.

In October 2019, the BCHL confirmed that it was in talks to buy the West Kelowna Warriors from current sole owner Kim Dobranski's KD Sports, Ltd. with unaudited financial results that showed the team lost $60,000 for the fiscal year ending July 31, 2019. In November 2019, the Warriors were purchased by John Murphy and Rod Hume under JMRH Hockey Development ULC, with Murphy serving as governor and Hume as managing partner, and the BCHL approving the sale and the sale effective date being November 11, 2019. The Warriors also announced that Chris Laurie was named team president.

Season-by-season records
Note: GP = Games played, W = Wins, L = Losses, T = Ties, OTL = Overtime losses, GF = Goals for, GA = Goals against, Pts = Points

BCJHL Langley Lords/Thunder

Current BCHL franchise

Western Canada Cup
Western Canada championship from 2013 to 2017Participants: British Columbia Hockey League (BCHL) – Alberta Junior Hockey League (AJHL) – Saskatchewan Junior Hockey League (SJHL) – Manitoba Junior Hockey League (MJHL) – host teamRound-robin play with 1st vs. 2nd winner advancing to RBC Cup junior A national championship and loser to a runner-up game.3rd vs. 4th in semifinal with winner to the runner-up game and loser eliminated.Runner-up game determined second representative to national championship.

Royal Bank Cup
Hockey Canada junior A national championshipParticipants in 2016: Dudley Hewitt Cup champions (Central), Fred Page Cup champions (Eastern, Western Canada Cup champions (Western #1), Western Canada Cup runners-up (Western #2) and a host teamRound-robin play with top four in semifinal and winners to finals.

See also
List of ice hockey teams in British Columbia

References

External links
West Kelowna Warriors website

British Columbia Hockey League teams
West Kelowna
1994 establishments in British Columbia
Ice hockey clubs established in 1994